The Powerman Zofingen is a duathlon event in Zofingen (Switzerland) within the Powerman Duathlon World Series. On September 3, 2017, the world championships in the long distance was held for the tenth time in Zofingen, canton Argovia. The official name is ITU Powerman Long Distance Duathlon World Championships.

A duathlon consists of a running distance, a cycling lane and then again a running distance, which are carried out directly behind each other. Since 2002, the long-distance duathlon in Zofingen has the sequence of  running,  cycling and  running.

History 
Established in 1989, the Powerman Zofingen is to duathletes what the Ironman Hawaii is for triathletes. Bruno Imfeld and Urs Linsi brought the Powerman in Switzerland to life. The first race took place on 4 June 1989 over the distances  running –  cycling –  running. The first winners celebrated were Hermine Haas (Switzerland) in the women's section and Andreas Rudolph (Germany) in the men's section.

One of the most famous winners in Zofingen is the Swiss Natascha Badmann - she won the duathlon in Switzerland in 1996, 1997 and 2000. Furthermore, Badmann was the first European woman to win the Ironman Triathlon World Championship. She won the Ironman Triathlon World Championship in Hawaii in 1998, 2000, 2001, 2002, 2004, and 2005. The most successful athlete ever was Olivier Bernhard. The Swiss won the Duathlon eight times and earned the nickname "King of Zofingen". In January 2010, Olivier Bernhard, together with David Allemann and Caspar Coppetti, founded On AG and is involved in the development of running shoes.

For current overall rankings, see ITU Duathlon Points List Elite Men and Elite Women. Furthermore, the International Triathlete Union provides athlete search options for both triathletes and duathletes.

Ranking list: Men 
Medallists Men: Powerman Zofingen - Long Distance Duathlon

Ranking list: Women 

Medallists Women: Powerman Zofingen - Long Distance Duathlon

References

External links 
 Official website

Duathlon competitions
Recurring sporting events established in 1997
Zofingen
Annual sporting events in Switzerland
1997 establishments in Switzerland
Multisports in Switzerland